Columbia County is a county in the Commonwealth of Pennsylvania. It is located in Northeastern Pennsylvania. As of the 2020 census, the population was 64,727. Its county seat is Bloomsburg. The county was created on March 22, 1813, from part of Northumberland County. It was named Columbia, alluding to the United States and Christopher Columbus.

Columbia County is part of the Bloomsburg-Berwick, PA Metropolitan Statistical Area.

Geography

The southern tip of Columbia County is part of the Coal Region. The area of the county from the Susquehanna River south to several miles south of Numidia consists mostly of farmland and state game lands. Several communities developed along the Susquehanna River, such as Bloomsburg and Catawissa. From the Susquehanna River north as far as Waller, the county is mostly farmland with several patches of forest. North of Waller, the county is mostly state game lands and mountains.

The major streams in Columbia County are the Susquehanna River, Fishing Creek, Briar Creek, Catawissa Creek, and Roaring Creek.

Mountains

Source:

Major highways

Adjacent counties
Sullivan County (north)
Luzerne County (east)
Schuylkill County (southeast)
Northumberland County (southwest)
Montour County (west)
Lycoming County (northwest)

State park
Part of Ricketts Glen State Park is in the northern portion of Columbia County.

Demographics

As of the census of 2000, there were 64,151 people, 24,915 households, and 16,568 families residing in the county.  The population density was 132 people per square mile (51/km2).  There were 27,733 housing units at an average density of 57 per square mile (22/km2).  The racial makeup of the county was 97.59% White, 0.80% Black or African-American, 0.15% Native American, 0.52% Asian, 0.03% Pacific Islander, 0.33% from other races, and 0.58% from two or more races.  0.95% of the population were Hispanic or Latino of any race. 33.2% were of German, 10.0% American, 9.4% Irish, 8.1% Italian, 6.7% Polish and 6.2% English ancestry.

There were 24,915 households, out of which 27.70% had children under the age of 18 living with them, 53.80% were married couples living together, 8.70% had a female householder with no husband present, and 33.50% were non-families. 26.60% of all households were made up of individuals, and 11.80% had someone living alone who was 65 years of age or older.  The average household size was 2.42 and the average family size was 2.90.

In the county, the population was spread out, with 20.80% under the age of 18, 14.30% from 18 to 24, 25.90% from 25 to 44, 23.10% from 45 to 64, and 15.90% who were 65 years of age or older.  The median age was 38 years. For every 100 females, there were 90.80 males.  For every 100 females age 18 and over, there were 87.80 males.

2020 Census

Metropolitan Statistical Area
The United States Office of Management and Budget has designated Columbia County as the Bloomsburg-Berwick, PA Metropolitan Statistical Area (MSA).  As of the 2010 census the metropolitan area ranked 20th most populous in the State of Pennsylvania and the 368th most populous in the United States with a population of 82,562.  Columbia County is also a part of the larger Bloomsburg-Berwick-Sunbury, PA Combined Statistical Area (CSA), which combines the populations of Columbia County as well as Montour, Northumberland, Snyder and Union Counties in Pennsylvania.  The Combined Statistical Area ranked 8th in the State of Pennsylvania and 115th most populous in the United States with a population of 264,739.

Politics and government

|}

As of August 8, 2022, there are 38,545 registered voters in Columbia County.

 Republican: 20,182 (52.36%)
 Democratic: 12,546 (32.54%)
 Independent: 4,186 (10.86%)
 Third Party: 1,631 (4.31%)

While the county registration tends to be evenly matched between Democrats and Republicans, the county trends Republican in statewide elections. Donald Trump carried the county by more than 30 points in both 2016 and 2020. While John McCain received 51.6% of its vote to 47.1% for Barack Obama, this was a far-closer margin than the 20 points that George W. Bush carried it by in 2004. Each of the three row-office statewide winners carried Columbia in 2008. In 2006, Democrat Bob Casey Jr. received 51% of its vote when he unseated incumbent Republican US Senator Rick Santorum and Ed Rendell received 50.6% of the vote against Lynn Swann.

For many years Columbia County was represented in the State House by a conservative Democrat in the 109th district until John Gordner changed parties to Republican in 2001. He was elected to the State Senate in 2003 and succeeded by Republican David R. Millard. Columbia is in the 27th Senate district and 11th Congressional district.

County commissioners

Other county officials

State Senate

State House of Representatives

United States House of Representatives

United States Senate

Education

Colleges and universities
Bloomsburg University of Pennsylvania

Public school districts
 Benton Area School District
 Berwick Area School District (also in Luzerne County)
 Bloomsburg Area School District
 Central Columbia School District
 Millville Area School District
 Mount Carmel Area School District (also in Northumberland County)
 North Schuylkill School District (also in Schuylkill County)
 Southern Columbia Area School District (also in Northumberland County)

Technical school
 Columbia-Montour Area Vocational-Technical School

Charter school
SusQ Cyber Charter School - Bloomsburg

Private schools
Bald Hill School - Millville
Bloomsburg Christian School - Bloomsburg
Bloomsburg University Special Education Institute
Columbia Co Christian School - Bloomsburg
Greenwood Friends School - Millville
Heritage Christian Academy - Berwick
Holy Family Consolidate - Berwick
Keystone National High School - Bloomsburg
New Story - Berwick
Pennsylvania Institute For Conservation Education - Bloomsburg
Rainbow Hill School - Benton
St Columba School - Bloomsburg
Saint Matthews - Bloomsburg
Turkey Ridge School - Bloomsburg

Libraries
Bloomsburg Public Library
Columbia County Traveling Library
McBride Memorial Library
Orangeville Public Library

Communities

Under Pennsylvania law, there are four types of incorporated municipalities: cities, boroughs, townships, and, in at most two cases, towns. The following town, boroughs and townships are located in Columbia County:

Town
Bloomsburg (county seat)

Boroughs

Ashland (mostly in Schuylkill County)
Benton
Berwick
Briar Creek
Catawissa
Centralia
Millville
Orangeville
Stillwater

Townships

Beaver
Benton
Briar Creek
Catawissa
Cleveland
Conyngham
Fishing Creek
Franklin
Greenwood
Hemlock
Jackson
Locust
Madison
Main
Mifflin
Montour
Mount Pleasant
North Centre
Orange
Pine
Roaring Creek
Scott
South Centre
Sugarloaf

Census-designated places
Census-designated places are geographical areas designated by the U.S. Census Bureau for the purposes of compiling demographic data. They are not actual jurisdictions under Pennsylvania law. Other unincorporated communities, such as villages, may be listed here as well.

Almedia
Aristes
Buckhorn
Espy
Eyers Grove
Fernville
Foundryville
Iola
Jamison City
Jerseytown
Jonestown
Lightstreet
Lime Ridge
Locustdale (partially in Schuylkill County)
Mainville
Mifflinville
Numidia
Rohrsburg
Rupert
Slabtown
Waller
Wilburton Number One
Wilburton Number Two

Unincorporated communities
Central
Elk Grove
Mifflin Cross Roads

Population ranking
The population ranking of the following table is based on the 2010 census of Columbia County.

† county seat

See also

 National Register of Historic Places listings in Columbia County, Pennsylvania

References

 
1813 establishments in Pennsylvania
Anthracite Coal Region of Pennsylvania
Bloomsburg–Berwick metropolitan area
Counties of Appalachia
Populated places established in 1813